This is a list of fighter aces in World War II from the United Kingdom and the British Empire (Country names as per name at the time of World War II). For other countries see List of World War II aces by country.

For "turret fighters" such as the Boulton Paul Defiant, the pilot put the aircraft into position with the enemy and it was the gunner who controlled the armament, air victories are credited to both.

List

Abbreviations
 "KIA": Killed in action (dates are included where possible).
 "KIFA": Killed in Flying Accident.
 "MIA": Missing in action.
 "WIA": Wounded in action leading to death which, in some cases, may have occurred months later.
 "POW": taken Prisoner of war.
 "RTC": Road traffic collision.
 "FAA"denotes that the person served with the Royal Navy's Fleet Air Arm, rather than with the Royal Air Force.
N/RO; Navigator/Radio operator

Awards

See also 

 List of RAF aircrew in the Battle of Britain
 List of Royal Air Force aircraft squadrons

Notes

References

Citations

Bibliography 

 Allied aces of the Battle of Britain jpgleize.club.fr
 RAF Flying Aces of World War II www.acesofww2.com
 Battle of Britain Memorial British Airmen List The Airmen's Stories
 
 Brew, A. The Turret Fighters, Defiant and Roc. The Crowood Press Ltd., 2002, 
 
 

 

 

 
United Kingdom
Lists of British military personnel
Royal Air Force lists
Aces
Aces